The 1893 Ole Miss Rebels football team represented the University of Mississippi as an independent during the 1893 college football season. Led by Alexander Bondurant in his first and only season as head coach, Ole Miss compiled a record of 4–1.

Schedule

References

Ole Miss
Ole Miss Rebels football seasons
Ole Miss Rebels football